Vince Goo (born January 16, 1947) is a retired American basketball coach who was most recently the head coach of the women's basketball team at the University of Hawaiʻi at Mānoa.

The son of former Hawaii Rainbow Warriors basketball coach Ah Chew Goo, Goo got his start coaching men's basketball at the high school level in Hawaii, coaching the junior varsity squad at Castle High School for two years before being named the varsity coach. He later coached the varsity team at Kaiser High School, spending the first two seasons as an assistant before being promoted to head coach. 

Goo joined the women's basketball staff at Hawaii as an assistant under Bill Nepfel, and was promoted to head coach before the 1987–88 season. Under Goo, the Rainbow Wahine made five NCAA tournaments and four WNIT tournaments, and all 41 players who completed their eligibility at Hawaii playing for him all completed their degrees.

Goo announced he would retire from coaching at the end of the 2004 season after the Rainbow Wahine had their worst season under him.

Goo currently resides in Hawaii Kai with his wife Gay; he and his wife have four children.

Head coaching record

References

External links 
 Hawaii profile

1947 births
Living people
Sportspeople from Honolulu
Basketball coaches from Hawaii
High school basketball coaches in Hawaii
Hawaii Rainbow Wahine basketball coaches